Arthur Hutchinson (24 March 1903 – 13 October 1951) was an Australian rules footballer who played for the North Melbourne Football Club in the Victorian Football League (VFL).

Notes

External links 

1903 births
1951 deaths
Australian rules footballers from Victoria (Australia)
North Melbourne Football Club players